Rizki Amelia Pradipta (born 1 September 1990) is an Indonesian badminton player specializing in doubles affiliated with Jaya Raya Jakarta club. She was two times Asian Championships bronze medalists winning in 2018 and 2019. Pradipta also part of the national women's team that won the bronze medal at the 2018 Asian Games.

Career summary

Women's singles 
Pradipta career started when she was selected as a member of Indonesia national badminton team that competed in 2008 BWF World Junior Championships in Pune, India as a singles player. Coming as unseeded player, she performed quite well and beat Chan Tsz Ka from Hong Kong who was seeded 9/16 in the third round 21–23, 21–15, 21–12. In that tournament, Pradipta reached the fourth round only to be beaten by Porntip Buranaprasertsuk form Thailand 13–21, 21–16, 4–21.

In 2009, after such a good performance in Pune, Pradipta was chosen by PBSI to be promoted to join the national team in Cipayung as a singles player, but in early 2010, due to lack of results that she had achieved, she was finally relegated by PBSI and had to return to her club.

Change discipline and breakthrough 
After facing the agony of being relegated from the national team, Pradipta went back to her club Jaya Raya and tried to continue her career as an independent player. She then changed to play in doubles disciplines, and in 2011, started her partnership with Pia Zebadiah Bernadet who was just recently resigned from national team. As a new pair, they won their first tournament in 2012 Vietnam International beating Malaysian pair Amelia Alicia Anscelly and Soong Fie Cho 21–10, 21–15.

They won their second title after beating Korean pair Lee Se-rang and Yoo Hyun-young 21–17, 19v21, 21–13 in the final of 2012 Indonesia International, and finally they won their first Grand Prix title in 2012 Vietnam Open beating Ng Hui Ern and Ng Hui Lin from Malaysia 21–17, 21–19 in the final. In October 2012, they beat Suci Rizki Andini and Della Destiara Haris 21–15, 21–12 as both pairs brilliantly making all Indonesian final in Chinese Taipei Open. And for Pradipta and Zebadiah, it was their fourth title overall and second Grand Prix title.

In the beginning of 2013, after their good results in 2012, PBSI recognized their achievement, and called them back to the national team, this time as a double specialist. But then respectively, both players rejected the offer and continuing their career as an independent player.

In early May, they won their first title of the year after winning 2013 Malaysia Grand Prix Gold beating the evergreen Vita Marissa and her new starlet partner Aprilsasi Putri Lejarsar Variella 21–17, 16–21, 21–17 in the final. Following their good results, their world ranking was also growing rapidly and just after one and half years, the pair finally reached TOP 10 world ranking on 30 May 2013.

Awards and nominations

Achievements

Asian Championships 
Women's doubles

BWF World Tour (1 title, 2 runners-up) 
The BWF World Tour, which was announced on 19 March 2017 and implemented in 2018, is a series of elite badminton tournaments sanctioned by the Badminton World Federation (BWF). The BWF World Tour is divided into levels of World Tour Finals, Super 1000, Super 750, Super 500, Super 300 (part of the HSBC World Tour), and the BWF Tour Super 100.

Women's doubles

BWF Grand Prix (4 titles, 2 runners-up) 
The BWF Grand Prix had two levels, the Grand Prix and Grand Prix Gold. It was a series of badminton tournaments sanctioned by the Badminton World Federation (BWF) and played between 2007 and 2017.

Women's doubles

  BWF Grand Prix Gold tournament
  BWF Grand Prix tournament

BWF International Challenge/Series (2 titles) 
Women's doubles

  BWF International Challenge tournament
  BWF International Series tournament

Performance timeline

National team 
 Senior level

Individual competitions 
 Senior level

References

External links 
 

1990 births
Living people
People from Surakarta
Sportspeople from Central Java
Indonesian female badminton players
Badminton players at the 2018 Asian Games
Asian Games bronze medalists for Indonesia
Asian Games medalists in badminton
Medalists at the 2018 Asian Games
21st-century Indonesian women